Nicola Giorgino (born 17 September 1969 in Andria) is an Italian politician.

Former member of the centre-right party The People of Freedom and then Forza Italia, he was elected Mayor of Andria on 30 March 2010. He was re-elected for a second term at the 2015 Italian local elections.

He resigned and was removed from office on 29 April 2019 after an internal government crisis. He subsequently left Forza Italia and joined the right-wing populist party Lega Nord.

He also served as President of the Province of Barletta-Andria-Trani from October 2016 to April 2019.

See also
2010 Italian local elections
2015 Italian local elections
List of mayors of Andria

References

External links

1969 births
Living people
Mayors of places in Apulia
People from Andria
Presidents of the Province of Barletta-Andria-Trani
Forza Italia (2013) politicians
The People of Freedom politicians